KJDY-FM (94.5 FM) is a radio station licensed to serve Canyon City, Oregon, United States.  The station, which began broadcasting in 1996, is owned by Randolph and Debra McKone, through licensee KJDY, LLC.

Programming
KJDY-FM broadcasts a full-service country music format.  Syndicated programming includes After Midnite with Blair Garner hosted by Blair Garner from Premiere Radio Networks.

History
The Blue Mountain Broadcasting Company received the original construction permit for this station from the Federal Communications Commission on September 28, 1994.  The new station was assigned the KAJC call sign by the FCC on September 28, 1994.  The station was assigned new call sign KJDY-FM by the FCC on May 10, 1996.  KJDY-FM received its license to cover from the FCC on September 22, 1999.

Effective October 6, 2015, Blue Mountain Broadcasting sold KJDY-FM, sister station KJDY, and translator K229AX to KJDY, LLC, at a purchase price of $405,000.

Translators
KJDY-FM programming is also carried on a broadcast translator station to extend or improve the coverage area of the station.

References

External links

JDY-FM
Country radio stations in the United States
Radio stations established in 1996
1996 establishments in Oregon
Grant County, Oregon